is a Japanese archer who competed at the 2012 and 2016 Olympic Games. 

Kawanaka won a bronze medal at the 2012 Summer Olympics in the women's team event with teammates Ren Hayakawa and Miki Kanie. Their success, which came after a narrow victory over Russia in the third-place match, marked the first Olympic medal for Japan in team archery. Kawanaka was less successful in the women's individual event, losing in the opening elimination round. 

Kawanaka has contested the Asian Games twice. She was the flagbearer for the Japanese team at the opening ceremony of the 2014 Asian Games, and later won bronze in the women's team recurve competition with Hayakawa and Yuki Hayashi.

At the 2016 Summer Olympics, she again competed in the individual and team events, reaching the second round in the individual event, and the quarterfinal in the women's team event.

References

External links
 
 

Japanese female archers
Living people
1991 births
Olympic archers of Japan
Archers at the 2012 Summer Olympics
Archers at the 2016 Summer Olympics
Olympic bronze medalists for Japan
Olympic medalists in archery
Medalists at the 2012 Summer Olympics
Asian Games medalists in archery
Archers at the 2010 Asian Games
Archers at the 2014 Asian Games
Archers at the 2018 Asian Games
Asian Games bronze medalists for Japan
Medalists at the 2014 Asian Games
Medalists at the 2018 Asian Games
21st-century Japanese women